Jeremy Horgan-Kobelski (born August 11, 1978) is an American cyclist. He competed in the men's cross-country mountain biking event at the 2004 Summer Olympics.

References

External links
 

1978 births
Living people
American male cyclists
Olympic cyclists of the United States
Cyclists at the 2004 Summer Olympics
Sportspeople from Denver
American mountain bikers
Cyclists from Colorado